Thorleif Andresen (14 February 1945 – 4 August 2022) was a Norwegian cyclist.

Andresen was born in Enebakk on 14 February 1945, and was a younger brother of Ørnulf Andresen. He competed at the 1968, 1972 and the 1976 Summer Olympics. He also won the Norwegian National Road Race Championship in 1969 and 1971.

In 1985 he was awarded Gullplaketten from the Norwegian Cycling Federation, their most prestigious award.

He died in Chiang Rai, Thailand on 4 August 2022.

References

External links
 

1945 births
2022 deaths
Norwegian male cyclists
People from Enebakk
Olympic cyclists of Norway
Cyclists at the 1968 Summer Olympics
Cyclists at the 1972 Summer Olympics
Cyclists at the 1976 Summer Olympics
Sportspeople from Viken (county)